Beryllophantis allochlora is a species of moth of the family Tortricidae. It is found in Papua New Guinea. The habitat consists of montane rain forests with Nothofagus.

The wingspan is 12.5–14 mm for males and 14–14.5 mm for females. The ground colour of the forewings is pale emerald green, marbled darker and densely irrorated with dark fuscous to black scales, arranged in thin, irregular, transverse strigulae, and dusted with ochrous. The hindwings are pale silvery grey, rather darker towards the apex and with no trace of any pattern.

References

Moths described in 1979
Tortricini
Moths of Papua New Guinea
Taxa named by Marianne Horak